VMware Fusion is a software hypervisor developed by VMware for macOS systems. It allows Macs with Intel or the Apple M series of chips to run virtual machines with guest operating systems, such as Microsoft Windows, Linux, or macOS, within the host macOS operating system.

Overview
VMware Fusion can virtualize a multitude of operating systems, including many older versions of macOS, which allows users to run older Mac software that can no longer be run under the current version of macOS, such as 32-bit and PowerPC applications.

History 
VMware Fusion, which uses a combination of paravirtualization and hardware virtualization made possible by the Mac transition to Intel processors in 2006, marked VMware's first entry into Macintosh-based x86 virtualization. VMware Fusion uses Intel VT present in the Intel Core microarchitecture platform. Much of the underlying technology in VMware Fusion is inherited from other VMware products, such as VMware Workstation, allowing VMware Fusion to offer features such as 64-bit and SMP support. VMware Fusion 1.0 was released on August 6, 2007, exactly one year after being announced.

Along with the Mac transition to Apple silicon in 2020, VMware announced plans for Fusion to support the new M-series platform and ARM architecture, releasing a tech preview for M1 chips in September 2021. In November 2022, VMware Fusion 13 was released, allowing ARM virtualization on Apple Silicon chips. Coinciding with the release, VMware implemented support for TPM 2.0 and OpenGL 4.3, along with improvements to VMware Tools on Windows 11. VMware Fusion 13 retains support for Intel Macs, distributing the software as a universal binary.

System requirements
 Most Macs launched in 2015 or later with Apple Silicon or Intel processors for VMware Fusion 13, most Macs launched in 2012 or later for VMware Fusion 12, most Macs launched in 2011 or later for VMware Fusion 11, any x86-64 capable Intel Mac for VMware Fusion 8
 macOS Monterey or later for VMware Fusion 13, macOS Catalina or later for VMware Fusion 12, Mac OS X 10.11 El Capitan or later for VMware Fusion 11, Mac OS X 10.9 Mavericks or later for VMware Fusion 8
 Operating system installation media for virtual machines

Version history

See also
 Desktop virtualization
 Hardware virtualization
 VMware Workstation
 VMware Workstation Player

References

Further reading

External links
 

Fusion
Virtualization software
MacOS software